Parallels is the sixth studio album by American progressive metal band Fates Warning, released on October 29, 1991, through Metal Blade Records. The album reached No. 20 on the U.S. Billboard Heatseekers chart.

James LaBrie, who had recently joined Dream Theater, contributed background vocals on the song "Life in Still Water." On March 16, 2010, a special edition of Parallels was released through Metal Blade. This included a remaster of the original album, a bonus disc of live and demo tracks, as well as a DVD.

Critical reception 

Eduardo Rivadavia at AllMusic gave Parallels three stars out of five, calling it Fates Warning's "biggest commercial if not artistic success" and "an ideal first purchase for fans of traditional '80s metal." Highlights noted were "Eye to Eye", "Point of View" and "We Only Say Goodbye".

In 2005, the album was ranked No. 371 in Rock Hard magazine's book of The 500 Greatest Rock & Metal Albums of All Time.

Track listing

2010 deluxe edition bonus tracks 

Tracks 1–8 were recorded at the Palace Theatre in Hollywood, California on January 23, 1992.
Tracks 9–14 are demos.

Filmed live in concert in New Haven, Connecticut on February 13, 1992.
Features current interviews with all band members as well as acclaimed producer Terry Brown and Metal Blade Records CEO Brian Slagel.
Rare and exclusive interviews and behind-the-scenes footage from the 1992 U.S. tour.
Includes music videos for "Eye to Eye" and "Point of View".

Personnel

Fates Warning 
Ray Alder – lead vocals
Jim Matheos – guitar
Frank Aresti – guitar
Mark Zonder – drums, percussion
Joe DiBiase – bass

Additional credits 
James LaBrie – background vocals (track 2)
John Bailey – computer sequencing
Terry Brown – engineering, mixing, production
John Bailey – computer sequencing, engineering assistance
Stu Young – engineering assistance
Trevor Sadler – engineering assistance
Bob Ludwig – mastering
Brian Slagel – executive production

Chart performance

References 

Fates Warning albums
1991 albums
Metal Blade Records albums